RAM Racing, a former Formula One team
Ram Racing (endurance racing team), a British racing team of endurance race
RAM Racing (Argentina racing team), a Argentina racing team of TC2000 and Súper TC 2000 team